Barbonymus is a  ray-finned fish genus in the family Cyprinidae, containing some barb species.  The genus was only established in 1999, with the tinfoil barb (B. schwanenfeldii) as type species; thus, these fish are sometimes collectively called tinfoils. The new genus was established in recognition of the fact that some large Asian "barbs", formerly rather indiscriminately lumped in Barbus (typical barbels and relatives), Barbodes (barb-like carps) and Puntius (spotted barbs), form a distinct evolutionary lineage.

They are actually very close relatives of the common carp (Cyprinus carpio). Even though only five species are included at present, it is not certain whether these form a monophyletic lineage; the Java barb (B. gonionotus) for example seems to be very close indeed to Cyclocheilichthys, which unites a number of barb-like "carps". Past hybridization is known widely in Cyprinidae, and confounds molecular and other cladistic studies relying on a single source of data. Altogether the delimitation of the typical carps and allied genera remains still not fully solved.

Species
There are currently 10 recognized species in this genus:
 Barbonymus altus (Günther, 1868) (red-tailed tinfoil)
 Barbonymus balleroides (Valenciennes, 1842)
 Barbonymus belinka (Bleeker, 1860)
 Barbonymus collingwoodii (Günther, 1868)
 Barbonymus gonionotus (Bleeker, 1850) (Java barb)
 Barbonymus mahakkamensis (C. G. E. Ahl, 1922)
 Barbonymus platysoma (Bleeker, 1855)
 Barbonymus schwanenfeldii (Bleeker, 1853) (tinfoil barb)
 Barbonymus strigatus (Boulenger, 1894)
 Barbonymus sunieri (M. C. W. Weber & de Beaufort, 1916)

References 

  (2007): Evolutionary origin of Lake Tana's (Ethiopia) small Barbus species: indications of rapid ecological divergence and speciation. Anim. Biol. 57(1): 39–48.  (HTML abstract)

 
Cyprinidae genera
Barbs (fish)